The  is a botanical garden located at 2-1319 Kitagata, Okayama, Okayama, Japan. It is open daily except Tuesdays; an admission fee is charged.

The garden was founded in 1953 on a hillside site overlooking the city. It currently contains some 3,000 species, including good collections of camellias and maples.

See also 
 List of botanical gardens in Japan
 Korakuen Garden (nearby)

References 
 BGCI entry
 Handayama Botanical Garden (Japanese)
 Handayama information (Japanese)
 Photographs of the garden

Botanical gardens in Japan
Okayama
Gardens in Okayama Prefecture